Thomas Campbell may refer to:

Arts and entertainment
 Thomas Campbell (poet) (1777–1844), Scottish poet
 Thomas Campbell (sculptor) (1790–1858), Scottish sculptor
 Thomas Campbell (visual artist) (born 1969), California-based visual artist
 Tom Campbell (radio personality) (fl. late 20th century), American radio personality and voice actor
 Thomas P. Campbell (born 1962), director of the Fine Arts Museums of San Francisco
 Tommy Campbell (actor) (born 1978), stand-up comedian, actor and writer
 Tommy Campbell (musician) (born 1957), American jazz drummer

Politics
 Thomas Campbell (Australian politician) (1845–1885), Member of the Queensland Legislative Assembly
 Thomas C. Campbell (1845–1904), New York lawyer and Cincinnati political boss
 Thomas Cooper Campbell, New York state senator in the 98th New York State Legislature
 Thomas Edmund Campbell (1809–1872), seigneur and political figure in Canada East
 Thomas Edward Campbell (1878–1944), Governor of Arizona
 Thomas F. Campbell (1897–1957), New York politician
 Thomas Hayes Campbell (1815–1862), Illinois politician, Illinois Auditor
 Thomas Jefferson Campbell (1786–1850), American politician
 Thomas Joseph Campbell (1872–1946), Irish politician, journalist & jurist
 Thomas Mitchell Campbell (1856–1923), American politician, Governor of Texas
 Tom Campbell (California politician) (born 1952), former Congressman, 2010 U.S. Senate candidate
 Tom Campbell (Canadian politician) (1927–2012), Canadian mayor of Vancouver
 Tom Campbell (North Dakota politician) (born 1959), North Dakota Senate
 Tom Campbell (Washington politician), member of the Washington House of Representatives

Religion
 Thomas Campbell (writer) (1733–1795), Church of Ireland clergyman and traveller 
 Thomas Campbell (minister) (1763–1854), American religious leader
 Thomas Hardesty Campbell (1907–1989), American Cumberland Presbyterian minister
 Thomas Vincent Campbell (1863–1930), Irish-born missionary physician and entomologist

Sport
 Tom Campbell (athlete) (1898–1971), American Olympic runner

 Thomas P. Campbell (athlete), English runner
 Tom Campbell (South African cricketer) (1882–1924), South African wicket-keeper
 Thomas Campbell (New Zealand cricketer) (1871–1950), New Zealand cricketer
 Thomas Campbell (footballer) (born 1908), Scottish footballer
 Tommy Campbell (footballer) (born 1935), Scottish former footballer
 Thomas J. Campbell (American football) (1886–1972), college football head coach
 Tommy Campbell (American football) (born 1947), former American football player
 Tommie Campbell (born 1987), American gridiron football with the Calgary Stampeders
 Tom Campbell (footballer, born 1924) (1924–1990), Australian rules footballer for Hawthorn
 Tom Campbell (footballer, born 1991), Australian rules footballer for St Kilda
 Tom Campbell (ice hockey) (1922–1996), Canadian ice hockey player with the East York Lyndhursts

Other
 Thomas Lopton Campbell Jr. (1809–1893), American pioneer and Texas Ranger
 Thomas J. Campbell (university president) (1848–1925), of St. John's College (now Fordham University)
 Thomas D. Campbell (1882–1966), wheat farmer and pioneer of corporate farming
 Thomas Monroe Campbell (1883–1956), first Cooperative Extension Agent in the United States
 Tom Campbell (philosopher), philosopher and law professor
 Thomas Draper Campbell (1893–1967), anthropologist and professor of dentistry, former president of the Anthropological Society of South Australia
 Thomas Campbell, Scottish convict involved in the Glasgow Ice Cream Wars
 T. Colin Campbell, American biochemist who specializes in the effect of nutrition on long-term health

See also
 Tom Campbell Black (1899–1936), English aviator
 Thomas Cambell (1536–1614), English merchant who was Lord Mayor of London in 1609
 Thomas J. Campbell (disambiguation)
 Campbell (surname)